Bettant is a commune in the Ain department in eastern France.

Geography
The village lies in the commune's northwestern part, on the left bank of the river Albarine, which forms most of the commune's northern and eastern borders.

Population

See also
Communes of the Ain department

References

External links

Gazetteer Entry

Communes of Ain
Ain communes articles needing translation from French Wikipedia